Hornos is a municipality located in the province of Jaén, Spain. According to the 2005 census, the city has a population of 657 inhabitants.

See also 
 El Tranco de Beas Dam
 Sierra de Segura

References

External links 

Municipalities in the Province of Jaén (Spain)